Denn, Daniel O'Connells GAA is a Gaelic Athletic Association club based in the village of Crosskeys, County Cavan, Ireland. They are affiliated to Cavan GAA. The club was founded in 1969 by Mikey McCabe following the merging of the two clubs in the parish, Drumavaddy & Crosskeys.

History
Denn GAA came into existence in 1969, following the merging of the two clubs in the parish, Drumavaddy & Crosskeys. Despite some near misses in the 70's success didn't arrive until the 80's when in 1982, Denn won the ACFL Div 3 league, the first adult county title to be won by the club. Two years later in centenary year Denn won their first ever championship, beating Mountnugent in the Junior decider.
In 1986 Denn won promotion from Div 2 and in 1987 would play at the top tier of football in Cavan for the first time. The intermediate title was won in 1988 and Denn played Senior Championship football for the first time in 1989, reaching the Quarter Finals. Following a restructure of grades in the county, Denn found themselves back at Intermediate level in 1990 but won the title again that year.
The club spent the five years at Senior level until relegation in 1995. What followed was a series of hard luck stories where we were beaten in 4 intermediate finals before finally getting over the line in 2003. In that time(1998) they club won the ACFL Div 1 title the first and only county title won by the club at Senior level.

The club reached the final of the Cavan Senior Football Championship for the first time in 2008 and were in the final again in 2009. Denn lost both finals to Cavan Gaels.

Denn reached the final of the Cavan Junior Football Championship in 2020. The game was not played until August 2021, and Denn lost the decider to Templeport. Two months later, Denn would win the 2021 championship after defeating Drung by seven points in the final. Denn would later beat Antrim's Naomh Comhghall and Desertmartin from Derry to reach the final of the Ulster Junior Club Football Championship. Denn went on to win the final by seven points against Donegal champions Na Dúnaibh. After a win over St Brendan's from Manchester, Denn's journey came to an end at the All-Ireland semi-final, losing to Kerry's Gneeveguilla.

Camogie
Denn fields Camogie teams from underage to Minor, and Senior levels.

Denn CC won the Junior Camogie Championship in 2016 and intermediate in 2019. In 2019 they were Ulster Junior B Winners and All Ireland Finalists. They were named Anglo Celt Team of the Year in 2019.

Honours
 Cavan Senior Football Championship: 0
 Runners-up 2008, 2009 
 Cavan Intermediate Football Championship: 3
 1988, 1990, 2003
 Ulster Junior Club Football Championship: 1
 2021
 Cavan Junior Football Championship: 2
 1984, 2021
 Cavan Minor Football Championship: 4
 1950(1), 1952(1), 2005(4), 2006(3), 2015(3)

Notable players

Martin Cahill - County player 00s and 10s - named Cavan Senior Club Player of the Year in 2008

References

External links
Denn Official Website
Official Cavan GAA Website
Cavan Club GAA

Gaelic games clubs in County Cavan
Gaelic football clubs in County Cavan